Rabbit Flat was a roadhouse in the Northern Territory of Australia, in the locality of Tanami, about  from the Western Australia border. It lies between the Tanami Mine (45 km NW) and The Granites Mine (53 km SE) on the Tanami Road.

Roadhouse
The former Rabbit Flat Roadhouse claimed to be the most isolated one in Australia, with no other roadhouse within . It was established on 14 June 1969, by Bruce Farrands and his wife Jackie, a French national. An arrangement had been agreed between the Farrands and Ansett-Pioneer Coaches to provide overnight tent accommodation for a tourist route between Alice Springs and Darwin via Wave Hill, now known as Kalkarindji.

The location was chosen because of the availability of water at the Rabbit Flat well, on the stock route from Alice Springs to Halls Creek.
By December 1969, Rabbit Flat had been selected by the Bureau of Meteorology as a weather reporting station. Over time, the roadhouse became a stop for fuel, food and souvenirs. An orchard of fruit trees grew nearby, and jams and preservatives were produced on site. An airstrip was established 800m to the south.

On the morning of 6 August 1975, media interest was aroused when twin boys were born to the Farrands. Neither the surprised parents nor medical staff in Alice Springs were aware that more than one baby was expected.  Mother Jackie and the babies were flown to Alice Springs hospital by the Royal Flying Doctor Service of Australia for observation, because the boys were six weeks premature.  On arrival in Alice Springs, the pilot of the RFDS aircraft was reported to have quipped that "the population of Rabbit Flat doubled last night". A documentary film about Rabbit Flat was produced by the Australian Broadcasting Corporation for its television series A Big Country.

Closure of the Roadhouse
After more than 41 years of service, the Farrands decided to close the roadhouse to all services, except weather reporting and the sale of souvenirs and preserved goods. The change occurred on 31 December 2010.

Weather station
Rabbit Flat has a semi-arid climate (BSh) with long, hot summers and brief mild winters. Summers can be prone to heavy rainfall, and therefore humid at times, due to the monsoon influence. Winters are sunny, crisp and mild, although the nights can get nippy, with a few mornings dipping below 0C (32F). The roadhouse manager maintained the weather station at Rabbit Flat, the closest other station being at Balgo, a small Aboriginal community  to the west.

References

Map reference
 Westprint Heritage Maps.(2002) Tanami Track: Alice Springs, The Granites, Rabbit Flat, Billiluna, Halls Creek / compiled by John Deckert; cartographic design and production by Flat Earth Mapping. 3rd ed. Scale 1:1,000,000 (E 127°20' -- E 134°00'/S 17°25' --S 24°00') Nhill, Vic. : Westprint Heritage Maps.  also known as Westprint Heritage Maps for modern explorers.

Roadhouses in the Northern Territory
Tanami Desert